The Panasonic Lumix 45mm 2.8  lens is a macro lens for Micro Four Thirds system cameras.  It is co-branded between Leica and Panasonic, built in Japan under Leica management.

The lens has a hardware stabilization switch ("Mega OIS" in Panasonic branding).  It also has a switch for focal range, to reduce focus hunting when macro capability is not needed.

Focusing is internal, so polarizing filters can be used consistently.  The 46mm thread lets a Micro Four Thirds user share filters between it, the Panasonic 14mm, Panasonic 20mm, and Panasonic Leica 25mm & 15mm lenses.

References

External links
 LEICA DG MACRO-ELMARIT 45mm / F2.8 ASPH. / MEGA O.I.S.

45
Camera lenses introduced in 2009